Haringey London Borough Council is the local authority for the London Borough of Haringey in London, England. The council is elected every four years.

Political control
Since the first election to the council in 1964 political control of the council has been held by the following parties:

Leadership
The leaders of the council since 1965 have been:

Council elections
 1964 Haringey London Borough Council election
 1968 Haringey London Borough Council election
 1971 Haringey London Borough Council election
 1974 Haringey London Borough Council election
 1978 Haringey London Borough Council election (boundary changes reduced the number of seats by one)
 1982 Haringey London Borough Council election
 1986 Haringey London Borough Council election
 1990 Haringey London Borough Council election
 1994 Haringey London Borough Council election (boundary changes took place but the number of seats remained the same)
 1998 Haringey London Borough Council election
 2002 Haringey London Borough Council election (boundary changes reduced the number of seats by two) 
 2006 Haringey London Borough Council election
 2010 Haringey London Borough Council election
 2014 Haringey London Borough Council election
 2018 Haringey London Borough Council election
 2022 Haringey London Borough Council election

Borough result maps

By-election results

1964-1968
There were no by-elections.

1968-1971

1971-1974

1974-1978

1978-1982

The by-election was called following the resignation of Cllr. Jacqueline Goodwin.

The by-election was called following the resignation of Cllr. Eric Garwood.

The by-election was called following the resignation of Cllr. Leslie Collis.

The by-election was called following the resignation of Cllr. Timothy Allen.

The by-election was called following the resignation of Cllr. Aaron Weichselbaum.

The by-election was called following the resignation of Cllr. John Elkington.

The by-election was called following the resignation of Cllr. Michael Killingworth.

1982-1986

The by-election was called following the resignation of Cllr. Jeremy Corbyn.

The by-election was called following the resignation of Cllr. Cecil Baylis.

The by-election was called following the resignation of Cllr. Alistair Burt.

The by-election was called following the resignation of Cllr. Eva Robinson.

The by-election was called following the resignation of Cllr. Anthony Dignum.

The by-election was called following the resignation of Cllr. Collin Ware.

The by-election was called following the resignation of Cllr. Anthony Rigby.

The by-election was called following the resignation of Cllr. Iris Cressey.

1986-1990

The by-election was called following the resignation of Cllr. Nigel Knowles.

The by-election was called following the resignation of Cllr. Beth Simons.

The by-election was called following the resignation of Cllr. Anne Douglas.

The by-election was called following the resignation of Cllr. Jeffrey Lotery.

The by-election was called following the resignation of Cllr. Bernie Grant.

The by-election was called following the resignation of Cllr. Pat Craig-Jones.

The by-election was called following the resignation of Cllr. Paul Loach.

The by-election was called following the resignation of Cllr. Bernard Dehnel.

1990-1994

The by-election was called following the resignation of Cllr. William Golden.

The by-election was called following the disqualification of Cllr. Terence G. Pope.

The by-election was called following the death of Cllr. Vic Butler.

The by-election was called following the resignation of Cllr. Andreas Mikkides.

The by-election was called following the resignation of Cllr. Sheila M. Murphy.

The by-election was called following the resignation of Cllr. William A. Blackburne.

1994-1998

The by-election was called following the resignation of Cllr. Derek Wyatt.

The by-election was called following the resignation of Cllr. Ian Willmore. 

The by-election was called following the resignation of Cllr. Kerry Postlewhite.

The by-election was called following the resignation of Cllr. Claire Tikly.

The by-election was called following the death of Cllr. Philip Jones.

1998-2002

The by-election was called following the resignation of Cllr. Michael T. Green.

The by-election was called following the resignation of Cllr. June A. Anderson.

The by-election was called following the resignation of Cllr. Hugh B. S. Jones.

2002-2006

The by-election was called following the resignation of Cllr. David Prendergast.

The by-election was called following the resignation of Cllr. Josephine L. Irwin.

The by-election was called following the resignation of Cllr. Ross Laird.

The by-election was called following the resignation of Cllr. Barbara Fabian.

2006-2010

The by-election was called following the resignation of Cllr. Justin Portess.

The by-election was called following the resignation of Cllr. Wayne Hoban.

The by-election was called following the death of Cllr. Frederick A. Knight.

2010-2014
None

2014-2018

A by-election for Woodside was called following the death of Cllr Pat Egan.

A by-election for Woodside was called following the resignation of Cllr Denise Marshall.

A by-election for Woodside was called following the death of Cllr George Meehan.

The by-election was triggered by the resignation of Councillor James Ryan

A by-election for St Ann's was called following the resignation of Cllr Peter Morton.

2018-2022

The by-election was triggered by the resignation of Councillor Ishmael Osamor

Notes

References

External links 
 Haringey Council